Nicole Vaidišová was the defending champion, but chose not to participate that year.

16-year-old Michaëlla Krajicek won the title, upsetting home-crowd-favourite Akgul Amanmuradova 6–0, 4–6, 6–3 in the final.

Seeds

Draw

Finals

Top half

Bottom half

References

External links
 Main and Qualifying Draws

Singles
2005 WTA Tour
2005 in Uzbekistani sport